This is a list of hat-tricks in the Africa Cup of Nations, that being when a player scores three or more goals in a tournament match of the Africa Cup of Nations (not including Africa Cup of Nations qualification matches). Hat-tricks have occurred 17 times across the 33 editions.

Hat-tricks

Notable Africa Cup of Nations hat-tricks

He is the only player to score a hat-trick in an Africa Cup of Nations final.
 The fastest hat-trick was scored by Soufiane Alloudi of  against  in 2008, (1', 5', 28) in their 5–1 victory.
 The latest hat-trick without extra time was scored by Francileudo dos Santos of  against  in 2006, (35', 82', 90+3') in their 4–1 victory.
 The latest hat-trick in extra time was scored by Bernard Chanda of  against  in the semi-final of 1974, (70', 97', 111') in their 4–2 victory.
 The shortest hat-trick was scored by Benedict McCarthy of  against  in 1998, in the span of 14 minutes; (8', 11', 19', 21') in their 4–1 victory.
 The longest hat-trick was scored by Laurent Pokou of  against  in 1970, in the span of 67 minutes; (21', 60', 71', 80', 87') in their 6–1 victory.
 There is no player who scored a hat-trick in a match that his team drew or lost.
 1963; 1970; 1998 and 2006 are the only tournaments to have more than one hat-trick, with two each.
 On more than 15 occasions there were no hat-tricks scored in a tournament.
 There has been one occasion when two hat-tricks have been scored in the same match: when Egypt defeated Nigeria 6–3 in the group stage match of 1963; Egyptians Mohamed Morsi Hussein and Hassan El-Shazly scored three goals each.
  holds the record of most hat-tricks scored with 6.
  has conceded the most hat-tricks with 3 and conceded the most goals from hat-tricks with 12.

Hat-tricks

A hat-trick is achieved when the same player scores three or more goals in one match. Listed in chronological order.

By nation

See also

 List of hat-tricks
 List of Africa Women Cup of Nations hat-tricks
 List of African Nations Championship hat-tricks

References

hat-tricks
Africa Cup of Nations hat-tricks
Africa Cup of Nations hat-tricks